This is a list of defunct airlines of Cambodia.

References

 
Cambodia
Airlines, defunct